Figl is a surname. Notable people with the surname include:

Leopold Figl (1902–1965), Austrian politician 
Robert Figl (born 1967), German wheelchair racer